Talkhestan (also Romanized as Talkhestān; also known as Qal‘eh Khān, Qal‘eh-ye Khān, Qal‘eh-ye Sharīf Khān, and Talkestān) is a village in Malmir Rural District, Sarband District, Shazand County, Markazi Province, Iran. At the 2006 census, its population was 183, in 51 families.

References 

Populated places in Shazand County